Agylla nubens is a moth of the family Erebidae. It was described by William Schaus in 1899. It is found in Mexico.

References

Moths described in 1899
nubens
Moths of Central America